The Eilat Ashkelon Pipeline Company (also known as the Europe Asia Pipeline Company and by the acronym EAPC) operates several crude petroleum and refined petroleum products pipelines in Israel, most notably the Eilat Ashkelon Pipeline – which transports crude oil across southern Israel, between the Red Sea and the Mediterranean Sea. The EAPC also operates two maritime oil terminals as well as oil storage depots in the country.

The company was originally formed in 1968 as a 50/50% joint venture between Israel and Iran (during the Shah's rule) to transport crude oil shipped from Iran to Europe. However, Israel nationalized the company following the 1979 Iranian Revolution and the subsequent severing of relations between the two countries. In 2015, a Swiss court ordered Israel to pay Iran $1.1 billion in compensation for this, which it refused to do, arguing that this was prohibited by its Trading with the Enemy Act.

The services of the EAPC are: transporting crude oil and refined products, long term storage, crude oil blending, processing of liquefied petroleum gas, fuel oil, distillates and gas.

Eilat Ashkelon Pipeline Company is one of Israel's most secretive companies. According to the Financial Times, "EAPC has operated since its founding under a blanket state decree that shrouds its affairs in secrecy. Israel says the decree was issued for reasons relating to national security."

History

1956: "Afike Neft" (Crude Oil Channel) founded to transport crude oil from Sinai to Haifa
1957: construction of 3 oil tanks in Eilat, 20 cm (8") Ø pipeline from Eilat to Beer-Sheva, 3 oil tanks in Beer-Sheva, trains transport crude oil to Haifa, later construction of a 40 cm (16") Ø pipeline from Beer-Sheva to Ashdod and transportation by ship to Haifa
1959: construction of a 40 cm (16") Ø pipeline from Eilat to Haifa
1966: construction of the storage facility Ramat Yotam, Eilat; Jetty 1; booster station in Paran
1968: EAPC established, construction of a 106 cm (42") Ø pipeline from Eilat to Ashkelon, terminal and port in Ashkelon
1973: storage in Eilat expanded to 1.1 Mio. m3, in Ashkelon to 1.3 Mio. m3, additional booster station in Yotvata, 45 cm (18") Ø pipeline from Ashkelon to Ashdod
1996: construction of a sea and land terminal for fuel oil in Ashkelon
1998: construction of a modern LPG terminal
1999: joint venture EAPC and Petroleum & Energy Infrastructures Ltd. (PEI), distillates unloaded in Ashkelon und distributed/pumped by PEI
2000: marine services in Ashkelon moved to the Israel Electric Company's (IEC) Rutenberg Power Station's coal jetty
2002: conversion of storage tanks for distillates, filling station for tanker lorries
2003: reverse flow project finished (which allows Russian oil delivered by tankers to Ashkelon, reloaded onto tankers in Eilat for shipment to Asia)
2004: modern filling plant for LPG cylinders
2020: agreement reached with the UAE to transport Emirati oil from the Red Sea to the Mediterranean.

Pipelines

Crude oil pipelines
 Eilat port - Ashkelon port (Eilat Ashkelon Pipeline), 254 km, Ø 106 cm (42"), max 60 Mio. tons per year, 3 booster stations (Yotvata, Paran, Mashabei Sadeh)
 Ashkelon port - Haifa Refinery at Haifa port, 197 km, Ø 40 cm (16/18"), 3 pumping stations (Givati, Glilot, Hadera), max 5.5 Mio. tons per year
 Ashkelon port - Ashdod Refinery, 36 km, Ø 40 cm (18/16"), max 7 Mio. tons per year

Products pipeline
 Eilat port - Giv'ati - Haifa refinery, 260 km, Ø 40 cm (16"), distillates (gasoline, jet fuel, gasoil)

The bidirectional reverse flow project
This project reversed the flow direction of Eilat-Ashkelon pipeline oil - meaning that it can now also flow southwards instead of only northwards, as originally conceived when Israel consumed Iranian oil. The idea behind the project is to transport crude oil from Russia, Central Asian republics and the Caucasus through the Black Sea or the Baku-Tbilisi-Ceyhan pipeline to Southern Asia and the Far East at a competitive price. The capacity and size of the Suez Canal is limited and therefore expensive.
 Ashkelon port - Eilat port, 254 km, Ø 106 cm (42"), max 20 Mio. tons per year, 2 booster stations

Oil ports

See also
 Iran–Israel relations
 Nahal Zin fuel leak from an EAPC pipeline, 2011 ecological disaster

References

External links
Eilat Ashkelon Pipeline Company

Eilat
Israeli companies established in 1968
Oil and gas companies of Israel
Oil and gas companies of Iran
Oil pipeline companies
Iran–Israel relations